Ikimi Dubose-Woodson is an American chef and philanthropist. She is the co-founder and executive director of The Roots Fund.

Life 
She graduated from Johnson & Wales University, and Marriott and Ritz Carlton training program. She worked on LEO MKT. She worked as a chef.

In 2020, she founded the Roots Fund, with Tahiirah Habibi, and Carlton McCoy, Jr.

The Rooted in France program provides scholarships to the Burgundy School of Business .

In 2022, Wine Spectator and Zachys held a charity auction to raise money for Roots Fund scholarships.

References

External links 

 The Roots Fund Feature: Securing a Pathway for the BIPOC Community in Wine, VINTed, Scout Driscoll

American chefs
21st-century American philanthropists
Johnson & Wales University alumni
Year of birth missing (living people)
Living people
American women philanthropists
American women chefs